Cyril Arlon "Cy" Morgan (November 11, 1895 – September 11, 1946) was a Major League Baseball pitcher who played in  and  with the Boston Braves. He was born in  Lakeville, Massachusetts, to his parents, Joseph and Helen Morgan. Morgan never played the game as a child or in high school. The first record of his ever playing was in 1915 pitching for the Middleboro Athletic Club. In his first four years of playing baseball, Morgan averaged about 14 strikeouts per game.

External links

Biography about Cy Morgan's life from SABR

1895 births
1946 deaths
Boston Braves players
Major League Baseball pitchers
Baseball players from Massachusetts
People from Lakeville, Massachusetts
Sportspeople from Plymouth County, Massachusetts